This is a list of those who have served as Lord Lieutenant of King's County.

There were lieutenants of counties in Ireland until the reign of James II, when they were renamed governors. The office of Lord Lieutenant was recreated on 23 August 1831.

Governors

 Charles Moore, 6th Earl of Drogheda, 1752–1784; again in 1805
 Lawrence Parsons, 2nd Earl of Rosse, 1792–1831
 Henry Peisley L'Estrange –1831
 Thomas Bernard, 1828–1831

Lord Lieutenants
William Parsons, 3rd Earl of Rosse, 7 October 1831 – 31 October 1867
Thomas Bernard, 17 December 1867 – 13 December 1883
Francis Travers Dames-Longworth, 20 March 1883 – 1892
Lawrence Parsons, 4th Earl of Rosse, 13 June 1892 – 29 August 1908
William Parsons, 5th Earl of Rosse, 5 February 1909 – 10 June 1918
Edward Beaumont-Nesbitt, 3 September 1918 – 1922

References

Kings County